Bouquet is a 1959 album by The Percy Faith Strings It was released in 1959 by Columbia Records (catalog no. CL1322). It debuted on Billboard magazine's pop album chart on January 11, 1960, peaked at the No. 7 spot, and remained on the chart for 17 weeks.

Track listing
Side A
 "Bouquet" (Percy Faiht)
 "Tenderly"
 "Laura"
 "The Song from Moulin Rouge"
 "Beyond the Sea"
 "Autumn Leaves"

Side B
 "Speak Low"
 "Solitude"
 "Deep Purple"
 "Intermezzo"
 "Ebb Tide"
 "Fascination"

References

1959 albums
Columbia Records albums
Percy Faith albums